The Robert Haugh Performing Arts Center (HPAC) is a 1440-seat Theater located on the campus of Citrus College in Los Angeles.

References

External links 
 Haugh Performing Arts Center website

Citrus College
Glendora, California
Performing arts centers in California
Theatres in Los Angeles County, California
University and college arts centers in the United States
Tourist attractions in Los Angeles County, California